Inodrillia ricardoi is a species of sea snail, a marine gastropod mollusk in the family Horaiclavidae.

Description

Distribution
This marine species occurs in the Atlantic Ocean off Brazil.

References

 Rios E. de Carvalhos (2009) Compendium of Brazilian sea shells. Rio Grande: Evangraf. 676 pp. page(s): 332

External links

ricardoi